Yekaterina Vladimirovna Ivakina (born 7 December 1964 in Stavropol) is a female javelin thrower from Russia. She was born Yekaterina Slyadneva, and has previously been married Yekaterina Krasnikova. Her personal best throw is 64.89 metres, achieved in July 2000 in Oslo.  That mark was the last of 5 Masters W35 World Records she set during a two-month period of time during the summer of 2000.   The record lasted for over three years before it was surpassed by another Russian Tatyana Shikolenko.

International competitions

References

 
 sports-reference

1964 births
Living people
Russian female javelin throwers
Olympic female javelin throwers
Olympic athletes of Russia
Athletes (track and field) at the 2000 Summer Olympics
Athletes (track and field) at the 2004 Summer Olympics
World Athletics Championships athletes for Russia
Russian Athletics Championships winners